Listed below are the Major League Baseball teams with the best season win–loss records, as determined by winning percentage (.700 or better).

Season records

Since the season was expanded to 162 games in 1961, only two teams have managed a winning percentage of .700 or higher in a full season (which requires 114 or more wins): the 1998 New York Yankees and the 2001 Seattle Mariners.

Legend
NL = National League
AL = American League
AA = American Association

*- Due to the COVID-19 pandemic, the season was shortened to 60 games.

Pre-1886 teams
With shorter schedules (fewer than 100 games before 1884), it was more common for teams to finish with .700 or better winning percentages, as there was less of the evening-out effect of a longer season, and some seasons had multiple teams, with three in 1884 (between the three leagues that year) and in 1885.

In the list below (minimum 15 games played), six teams finished with better overall winning percentages than the 1906 Cubs, three being in the early years of the National league, and the other three in leagues whose status as "major" is questionable: two in the National Association, whose status as a major league has long been disputed, and the other in the Union Association, which is conventionally listed as a major league, but this has been questioned due to the league's overall lack of playing talent and poor organizational structure.

In addition, contemporary baseball guides did not consider the Union Association to be a major league: the earliest record referencing the Union Association as a major league dates to 1922.)

Legend
NA = National Association
NL = National League
AA = American Association
UA = Union Association

The all-time best single season record belongs to the Cincinnati Red Stockings, who posted baseball's only perfect record at 67–0 (57–0 against National Association of Base Ball Players clubs) in 1869, prior to Major League baseball. Their record would stretch to 81–0 across the 1870 season before losing 8–7 in eleven innings to the Brooklyn Atlantics in Brooklyn on June 14.

See also
List of worst Major League Baseball season records
List of Major League Baseball 100 win seasons

References

External links
Records and statistics at Baseball Reference
Baseball Almanac study of best teams of all time
Excerpts from "Baseball Dynasties" by Neyer and Epstein
Neyer, Rob, and Eddie Epstein. Baseball Dynasties: The Greatest Teams of All Time. Norton, 2000, 384 p.

Season won